The Company of Entrepreneurs is a Company without Livery and an aspirant Livery Company of the City of London.  It successfully petitioned the Court of Aldermen for Guild status in 2014  with ambitions to become a full Livery Company by 2024. It is a membership and charitable organisation formed of men and women connected with the City of London who have invested their own time and financial resources in establishing and running successful businesses and enterprises. Its motto is Dare, Create, Succeed

On 20 October 2020, the Court of Aldermen met to publicly determine the progression of the Guild of Entrepreneurs to a Company without Livery. In a meeting by virtual presence live-streamed via YouTube, Alderman Sir David Wootton announced the recommendation of the Court’s General Purposes Committee that the Guild of Entrepreneurs become the Company of Entrepreneurs. He proposed the motion, which was seconded by Alderman Sir Roger Gifford, and the motion was passed.  This was the culmination of six years of fundraising and activity as a Guild.

The Company of Entrepreneurs Trust is a charity that was registered in England & Wales in 2016 (as the Guild of Entrepreneurs Trust). It is a grant-making body, which principally supports business education.

Introduction 

Whilst the Company of Merchant Adventurers and Society of Merchant Venturers continued the distinct craft of entrepreneurship (merchant venturing) in York and Bristol respectively, there was, in the early 21st Century, no comparable extant organisation in London.

About this time, the city was recapturing some of its ancient trading origins alongside its established global role in financial and professional services. The repurposing of once large banking halls, the growth of the business centre market and the development of technology were again making the city and the surrounding area more accessible to new types of entrepreneurial activity including media, textiles, communications, retail and leisure. This entrepreneurial activity was extending into neighbourhoods such as Smithfield, Shoreditch, Spitalfields and Borough on the City fringes where small business growth was already being supported by initiatives from the City of London Corporation and its formal partners along with the Angel and Venture Capital market. The city was alive with business networks, investment clubs, technology meetings and associations, suggesting that there were many thousands of entrepreneurs with an affinity with the City of London.

Entrepreneurs – City of London Network 

The serial finance and communications entrepreneur Dan Doherty (a liveryman of the Needlemakers’ Company), had already founded and was running a successful informal group for Entrepreneurs called “Entrepreneurs – City of London Network”.

The network met regularly at the London Capital Club in the city, and had always linked its activities to promoting enterprise in and around the city, appreciated the city’s civic activities, supported charity and pro-bono work and hosted events in City venues. The membership of this group included a number of liverymen of the city’s Livery Companies, and from amongst them and others, the Founding Committee of the proposed Guild was drawn.

Formation and Early History 

With assistance from the Chamberlain’s Court and from Adele Thorpe (a Past Master of the Worshipful Company of Chartered Secretaries and Administrators and Clerk of many years’ standing), a proposal document was drawn up and delivered to the Court of Aldermen. It was accompanied by numerous letters of support from amongst the City Livery Companies, academic institutions and businesses. Approval was given for the formation of the new Guild on 8 July 2014.

Formal working party meetings were held in August and September 2014 to approve the rules and suggested governance of the Guild, and, on 8 September 2014, the Guild’s first Court Meeting was held at the Old Bailey, with the following Founding Freemen elected to serve as Court Assistants:
 Dan Doherty
 Judith Donovan CBE
 Neil Fullbrook
 Rupa Ganatra
 Alderman Peter Hewitt
 Alderman Sir Paul Judge
 Rick Lowe
 Neil Partridge
 Lee Robertson
 Fiona Taylor
 Ian Taylor

Sir Paul Judge, who was at that time serving his shrieval year, had been the Guild’s sponsoring Alderman, and Dan Doherty proposed that Sir Paul be installed as the Guild’s Foundation Master. The Court approved this, and the following officers were elected to serve for the first year:
 Master: Alderman Sir Paul Judge
 Senior Warden: Dan Doherty
 Middle Warden: Judith Donovan CBE
 Junior Warden: Alderman Peter Hewitt

In addition to those elected to serve as Court Assistants, the Guild also recognised the support of five other Founding Freemen:
 Lord Bilimoria, CBE DL
 Ben Camara
 Dieter R Klostermann
 Cyrus Todiwala, OBE DL
 Pervin Todiwala

On 24 November 2014 the Guild had its official launch at Ironmongers’ Hall (Worshipful Company of Ironmongers). The event was attended by the then Lord Mayor, the Sheriffs, Masters and Clerks representing over half of the city’s (then) 110 Livery Companies, as well as numerous guests. This historic ceremonial occasion lived long in the memories of those who were there – not least due to the rousing cheers of “Welcome Entrepreneurs!” that rang out that evening. It was on this occasion that the Foundation Master was installed, and the Wardens and Court sworn in, and it is on or around 24 November each year that each new Master is Installed.

Objectives 

The objectives of the company are to:
 promote excellence in the profession of Entrepreneurship;
 support the Lord Mayor, encourage the growth of the city and promote its full potential to entrepreneurs and growth businesses;
 foster fellowship among entrepreneurs;
 give money and time for charitable works that support education in enterprise; the development of entrepreneurs; and help to bring the opportunities of entrepreneurship to all.
An entrepreneur will have identified new market opportunities, sourced and organised the required people and resources, and experienced both the risks and rewards associated with such ventures.

Activities 

The company has a busy programme of social, educational and charitable events, which fulfil the company's founding objectives. In particular, the company has a wide range of Outreach & Educational projects in which Freeman (members of the company, whether men or women) undertake mentoring for students of business and entrepreneurship as well as fledgling businesses and entrepreneurial activities.

The Company of Entrepreneurs Trust is a charitable foundation set up in 2016, but operating independently. Its primary objective is to raise and distribute money to support education and charity relating to entrepreneurship.

Motto 

The company's motto is Dare, Create, Succeed. The motto encapsulates the criteria that an individual must fulfil before they may be considered for the Freedom of the company: to be audacious and daring in identifying new opportunities; to have personally financed, created and run businesses or enterprises to harness those opportunities; and for those businesses or enterprises to have been successful.

Organisation 

The company is governed by the Court, which is made up of the Master, three Wardens, the most recent five Past Masters and between six and twenty Court Assistants elected from the Freemen. The Master and Wardens are elected annually at the Election Court in June/July, and take office at the Installation Court in November. The Clerk is the Chief Executive of the company. The first Clerk was Adele Thorpe. Duncan Simms has been Clerk since February 2015.

The Officers are presently:

Master: Gary Dixon

Senior Warden: Mark Norman Huxley FRSA

Middle Warden: Alderman Alastair John Naibitt King

Junior Warden: James Talbot

Immediate Past Master: Judy Hadden

Founder & Master, Dan Doherty 
Having played so pivotal a role in the foundation, organisation and birth of the Guild of Entrepreneurs, Dan Doherty was elected to serve as the second Master Entrepreneur at the Election Court in July 2015.

In October 2015, just weeks before his installation as Master, Dan was diagnosed with a brain tumour. Ably supported by his many friends and colleagues, he was installed as Master at Painters' Hall on 25 November 2015. He requested and was granted an immediate leave of absence to begin treatment for his illness, but his condition overwhelmed him and he died in office on 16 March 2016.

In memory of his work as the founder of the Guild, and his Mastership, the Guild's Court purchased by private subscription the Dan Doherty Memorial Bell. The bell rings in E for Entrepreneurs and was founded at the Whitechapel Bell Foundry in London's East End. The bell is rung once each year at the Installation Dinner and a toast drunk.

Past Masters

2014-2015      Sir Paul Rupert Judge

2015-2016      Daniel Edward Doherty (died in office 16 March 2016)

2016-2017      Catherine Karen Jolly

2017-2018      Lee John Robertson

2018-2019      Hon. Gp Capt. Peter Lionel Raleigh Hewitt JP

2019-2020      Richard Paul Lowe

2020-2021      Lars Bendik Andersen

2020-2021      Judy Hadden

References

External links 
 
 
 www.entrepreneurscompany.org

British companies established in 2014
Guilds in England
2014 establishments in England